Tennis Cup is a sports game developed by Loriciel in 1990 for various home computers. It was ported to TurboGrafx-16 in 1991 as Davis Cup Tennis, and to Super Nintendo and Mega Drive/Genesis in 1993. A Game Boy Advance port was then developed by Hokus Pokus Games and published by Ubisoft in 2002. A sequel, Tennis Cup 2, was released in 1992 for the Amiga, Atari ST, and DOS.

In the GBA version's two game modes, the player assumes control of either a tennis player during a single match or an entire country's team in the Davis Cup, an international competition. Multiplayer is supported through the link cable. The game garnered mixed reviews from critics, who overall felt that it paled in comparison to 2002's Virtua Tennis and earlier versions of Mario Tennis.

Gameplay
The game follows the rules of tennis closely. Each match has a minimum of 5 sets by default. Players are able to control the difficulty of the AI before starting their game as well. The player can either choose to play a "Quick Play" mode which allows for a single tennis match, or to play through the full Davis Cup, where the player must choose the team captain and compete through the entire tournament with the rotating player rotation.

The tennis players are represented by two-dimensional sprites, while the court is given the illusion of being three-dimensional. Players are able to control the power of their initial serve, but cannot control how hard they hit balls already in play.

Reception

Davis Cup Tennis garnered mixed reviews from gaming press, who felt that the game was lackluster compared to Virtua Tennis. GameSpot's Frank Provo and IGN's Craig Harris both criticized the lack of an in-game save option that you could activate during your match, with Craig Harris remarking that the design "isn't exactly handheld friendly". Frank Provo felt that the larger variety of techniques found in Virtua Tennis made it "the better option". GameSpy's Avi Fryman remarked on the game's averageness in comparison to its competitors, commenting "... if all available copies of Virtua Tennis and Mario Tennis suddenly vaporized, there might be a reason for casual gamers to pick this one up."

References

External links
Tennis Cup at MobyGames
Tennis Cup 2 at MobyGames
Davis Cup Tennis (SNES, MD) at MobyGames
Tennis Cup at the Hall of Light
Tennis Cup 2 at the Hall of Light

1990 video games
Amiga games
Amstrad CPC games
Atari ST games
Davis Cup
DOS games
Game Boy Advance games
Multiplayer and single-player video games
Taito games
Tengen (company) games
Tennis video games
TurboGrafx-16 games
TurboGrafx-CD games
Ubisoft games
Video games developed in France
Virtual Studio games